Layton is an unincorporated community located within Sandyston Township in Sussex County, New Jersey, United States. The area is served as United States Postal Service ZIP code 07851.

As of the 2000 United States census, the population for ZIP Code Tabulation Area 07851 was 250.

Layton is located 574 feet (175 m) above sea level.

The Dingman's Ferry Bridge, crosses the Delaware River at Layton, connecting County Route 560 in New Jersey to PA 739 in Pennsylvania.

Demographics

History
Layton was first settled around 1800 by John Layton and was known as Centreville, the settlement is located roughly in the middle of the township at the confluence of Layton-Bevans Road (CR 640), Tuttles Corner-Dingmans Road (CR 560), and Layton-Hainesville Road (CR 645).  The Little Flat Brook, which provided a source of power for early mills, runs through the middle of the village.  Simeon Fisher, a blacksmith, is noted to be the first to open a business at this site, followed by Abraham Bell, who had a carpenter's shop and a tavern.  In 1835, Squire Layton established a store that served the residents of the community and travels alike.  By 1860, the hamlet had significantly expanded to include a Methodist church, two stores, a post office, a tannery, a blacksmith shop, a cooperage shop, a sawmill, a small shop, a gristmill, a hotel, and more than fifteen dwellings.  Shortly after that date, a one-room schoolhouse was erected in the hamlet.

In 1861, John B. Layton petitioned Washington, D.C. for mail delivery.  The petition was in the name of Centerville, but that name was already being used by another community in the state.  The name "Laytons" was assigned to this area, named for Layton who had put forth the petition.  The name was later changed by the Post Office Department by dropping the 's'.

In 1906, the State Industrial Directory reported the village to include a gristmill, a creamery owned by Siler & Company, several residences, and population to be about one hundred. The number of residents declined to sixty by 1915.  "The village occupies an exceptionally fine location with regard to healthfulness of climate and beauty of scenery.  It is only two miles from the Delaware River, and a short distance from several small but fine lakes, the waters of which come from mountain streams.  The elevation is 550 feet over sea level.  Fish abound in all the waters about the village, and every other feature of healthful, picturesque country life, on which people who leave the cities during the summer months set a high value, are found here."

Climate
This climatic region is typified by large seasonal temperature differences, with warm to hot (and often humid) summers and cold (sometimes severely cold) winters.  According to the Köppen Climate Classification system, Layton has a humid continental climate, abbreviated "Dfb" on climate maps.

Notable people

People who were born in, residents of, or otherwise closely associated with Layton include:
 George B. Harper (1918-1988), politician who served in the New Jersey Senate from 1954 to 1964.
 Harry Harper (1895-1963), pitcher who played in the major leagues for four different teams.

References

External links

Census 2000 Fact Sheet for ZIP Code Tabulation Area 07851 from the United States Census Bureau

Sandyston Township, New Jersey
Unincorporated communities in Sussex County, New Jersey
Unincorporated communities in New Jersey